

413001–413100 

|-id=033
| 413033 Aerts ||  || Conny Aerts (born 1966) is a Belgian astrophysicist and Professor at the Katholieke Universiteit Leuven, known for her cutting-edge and innovative work in asteroseismology and for her efforts in encouraging women to choose science as a career. She received the Francqui Prize in 2012. Name suggested by K. Lefever. || 
|}

413101–413200 

|-bgcolor=#f2f2f2
| colspan=4 align=center | 
|}

413201–413300 

|-id=233
| 413233 Várkonyiágnes ||  || Ágnes R. Várkonyi (1928–2014) was a Hungarian historian, cultural historian, and full member of the Hungarian Academy of Sciences. Her main field of research was the Rákóczi War of Independence, the Zrínyi Movement, and the Habsburg system. She was the winner of the 1999 annual science communication award. || 
|}

413301–413400 

|-bgcolor=#f2f2f2
| colspan=4 align=center | 
|}

413401–413500 

|-bgcolor=#f2f2f2
| colspan=4 align=center | 
|}

413501–413600 

|-bgcolor=#f2f2f2
| colspan=4 align=center | 
|}

413601–413700 

|-bgcolor=#f2f2f2
| colspan=4 align=center | 
|}

413701–413800 

|-bgcolor=#f2f2f2
| colspan=4 align=center | 
|}

413801–413900 

|-bgcolor=#f2f2f2
| colspan=4 align=center | 
|}

413901–414000 

|-bgcolor=#f2f2f2
| colspan=4 align=center | 
|}

References 

413001-414000